Wittewater is a town in Bergrivier Local Municipality in the Western Cape province of South Africa, located off the R399 road, between Piketberg and Velddrif. It was established in the 1857 by German Moravian missionaries.

The name, "white water", refers to the waterfall behind the town occasionally created by abundant winter rain.

References

Populated places in the Bergrivier Local Municipality
Populated places established in 1857
1857 establishments in the Cape Colony